The 29th Chess Olympiad (29. Šahovska olimpijada), organized by FIDE and comprising an open and a women's tournament, as well as several other events designed to promote the game of chess, took place between November 16 and December 4, 1990, in Novi Sad, Yugoslavia (present-day Serbia).

This time around, the political controversy surrounded the Baltic states – Estonia, Latvia, and Lithuania – who had all recently declared their independence from the Soviet Union and wanted to send their own teams to the Olympiad. The Yugoslavian hosts, however, followed the decree from Moscow and refused to accept their entries. Despite a petition from several top players they weren't allowed to play. This meant that big names like Jaan Ehlvest, Lembit Oll, Alexei Shirov, and former world champion Mikhail Tal could not appear at the Olympiad.

Incidentally, this would also turn out to be the last Olympic appearances of the "old" Eastern Bloc countries: East Germany, Yugoslavia and the Soviet Union. The latter finished in style by winning their sixth consecutive gold medals and 18th overall, even without Garry Kasparov and Anatoly Karpov who were in the midst of their fifth and final world championship match. Instead, the last Soviet team was led by Ivanchuk and Gelfand – two of the co-signers of the pro-Baltic petition. They still won in style, well ahead of the United States and England.

Open event

A total of 108 teams from 106 different nations played a 14-round Swiss system tournament. For the first time, the host nation got the right to field two additional teams. All three Yugoslavian sides finished in the top 30.

In the event of a draw, the tie-break was decided first by using the Buchholz system, then by match points.

{| class="wikitable"
|+ Open event
! # !! Country !! Players !! Averagerating !! Points !! Buchholz
|-
| style="background:gold;"|1 ||  || Ivanchuk, Gelfand, Beliavsky, Yusupov, Yudasin, Bareev || 2645 || 39 || 
|-
| style="background:silver;"|2 ||  || Seirawan, Gulko, Christiansen, Benjamin, Fedorowicz, De Firmian || 2599 || 35½ || 452.5
|-
| style="background:#cc9966;"|3 ||  || Short, Speelman, Nunn, Adams, Chandler, Hodgson || 2604 || 35½ || 450.5
|}
{| class="wikitable collapsible collapsed"
! # !! Country !! Averagerating !! Points !! Buchholz !! MP
|-
| 4 ||  || 2530 || 34½ ||  || 
|-
| 5 ||  || 2576 || 33 || 460.0 || 
|-
| 6 ||  || 2521 || 33 || 444.0 || 
|-
| 7 ||  || 2526 || 33 || 440.5 || 
|-
| 8 ||  || 2451 || 32½ || 452.0 || 
|-
| 9 ||  || 2549 || 32½ || 451.0 || 
|-
| 10 ||  || 2488 || 32½ || 449.0 || 
|-
| 11 ||  || 2439 || 32½ || 441.5 || 
|-
| 12 ||  || 2561 || 32½ || 435.0 || 
|-
| 13 ||  "B" || 2534 || 32½ || 433.0 || 
|-
| 14 ||  || 2514 || 32 || 451.5 || 
|-
| 15 ||  || 2493 || 32 || 433.0 || 
|-
| 16 ||  || 2533 || 32 || 431.0 || 
|-
| 17 ||  || 2553 || 32 || 427.5 || 
|-
| 18 ||  || 2476 || 32 || 421.5 || 
|-
| 19 ||  || 2463 || 32 || 414.5 || 
|-
| 20 ||  || 2424 || 31½ || 429.5 || 
|-
| 21 ||  || 2443 || 31½ || 427.0 || 
|-
| 22 ||  || 2381 || 31½ || 421.0 || 
|-
| 23 ||  || 2381 || 31½ || 418.5 || 
|-
| 24 ||  || 2449 || 31½ || 416.5 || 
|-
| 25 ||  || 2509 || 31 || 446.0 || 
|-
| 26 ||  "C" || 2506 || 31 || 441.0 || 
|-
| 27 ||  || 2456 || 31 || 436.5 || 
|-
| 28 ||  || 2416 || 31 || 425.0 || 
|-
| 29 ||  || 2439 || 31 || 423.5 || 
|-
| 30 ||  || 2451 || 31 || 418.5 || 
|-
| 31 ||  || 2495 || 31 || 417.0 || 
|-
| 32 ||  || 2483 || 31 || 412.5 || 
|-
| 33 ||  || 2471 || 30½ || 420.5 || 
|-
| 34 ||  || 2454 || 30½ || 415.0 || 
|-
| 35 ||  || 2409 || 30½ || 412.0 || 
|-
| 36 ||  || 2501 || 30 || 427.5 || 
|-
| 37 ||  || 2473 || 30 || 425.0 || 
|-
| 38 ||  || 2498 || 30 || 424.0 || 
|-
| 39 ||  || 2465 || 30 || 417.5 || 
|-
| 40 ||  || 2386 || 30 || 417.0 || 
|-
| 41 ||  || 2376 || 30 || 416.5 || 
|-
| 42 ||  || 2301 || 30 || 391.5 || 
|-
| 43 ||  || 2295 || 29½ ||  || 
|-
| 44 ||  || 2201 || 29 || 405.5 || 17
|-
| 45 ||  || 2349 || 29 || 405.5 || 14
|-
| 46 ||  || 2370 || 29 || 396.0 || 
|-
| 47 ||  || 2346 || 29 || 394.5 || 
|-
| 48 ||  || 2240 || 29 || 376.0 || 
|-
| 49 ||  || 2450 || 28½ || 427.5 || 
|-
| 50 ||  || 2343 || 28½ || 405.0 || 
|-
| 51 ||  || 2363 || 28½ || 403.5 || 
|-
| 52 ||  || 2329 || 28½ || 403.0 || 
|-
| 53 ||  || 2369 || 28½ || 396.5 || 
|-
| 54 ||  || 2276 || 28½ || 392.0 || 
|-
| 55 ||  || 2411 || 28 || 439.0 || 
|-
| 56 ||  || 2295 || 28 || 397.5 || 
|-
| 57 ||  || 2295 || 28 || 395.5 || 
|-
| 58 ||  || 2256 || 28 || 392.0 || 
|-
| 59 ||  || 2306 || 28 || 391.0 || 
|-
| 60 ||  || 2249 || 28 || 387.5 || 
|-
| 61 ||  || 2230 || 28 || 377.5 || 
|-
| 62 ||  || 2324 || 28 || 377.0 || 
|-
| 63 ||  || 2291 || 27½ || 395.0 || 
|-
| 64 ||  || 2230 || 27½ || 378.5 || 
|-
| 65 ||  || 2235 || 27½ || 372.0 || 
|-
| 66 ||  || 2226 || 27½ || 369.0 || 
|-
| 67 ||  || 2216 || 27 || 383.0 || 
|-
| 68 ||  || 2200 || 27 || 369.5 || 
|-
| 69 ||  || 2259 || 26 || 390.0 || 
|-
| 70 ||  || 2218 || 26 || 384.5 || 
|-
| 71 ||  || 2244 || 26 || 380.5 || 
|-
| 72 ||  || 2241 || 26 || 366.5 || 
|-
| 73 ||  || 2228 || 26 || 362.5 || 
|-
| 74 ||  || 2200 || 26 || 361.5 || 
|-
| 75 ||  || 2230 || 26 || 337.0 || 
|-
| 76 ||  || 2285 || 25½ || 386.0 || 
|-
| 77 ||  || 2235 || 25½ || 378.5 || 
|-
| 78 ||  || 2296 || 25½ || 361.5 || 
|-
| 79 ||  || 2240 || 25 || 381.0 || 
|-
| 80 ||  || 2268 || 25 || 374.5 || 
|-
| 81 ||  || 2203 || 25 || 366.5 || 
|-
| 82 ||  || 2206 || 25 || 346.5 || 
|-
| 83 ||  || 2240 || 24½ || 364.0 || 
|-
| 84 ||  || 2218 || 24½ || 351.5 || 
|-
| 85 ||  || 2213 || 24½ || 350.0 || 
|-
| 86 ||  Libya || 2201 || 24½ || 345.5 || 
|-
| 87 ||  and  || 2218 || 24 || 362.5 || 11
|-
| 88 ||  || 2209 || 24 || 362.5 || 6
|-
| 89 ||  || 2229 || 24 || 362.0 || 
|-
| 90 ||   || 2209 || 24 || 349.0 || 
|-
| 91 ||  || 2246 || 24 || 345.0 || 
|-
| 92 ||  || 2203 || 24 || 341.0 || 
|-
| 93 ||  || 2201 || 23½ || 358.5 || 
|-
| 94 ||  || 2200 || 23½ || 347.5 || 
|-
| 95 ||  || 2210 || 23½ || 343.0 || 
|-
| 96 ||  || 2204 || 23 || 357.5 || 
|-
| 97 ||  || 2200 || 23 || 326.0 || 
|-
| 98 ||  || 2200 || 22 || 326.5 || 
|-
| 99 ||  || 2200 || 22 || 326.0 || 
|-
| 100 ||  || 2200 || 22 || 323.5 || 
|-
| 101 ||  || 2226 || 22 || 317.0 || 
|-
| 102 ||  || 2200 || 22 || 315.5 || 
|-
| 103 ||  || 2200 || 22 || 282.0 || 
|-
| 104 ||  || 2200 || 21½ || 323.5 || 
|-
| 105 ||  || 2201 || 21½ || 314.0 || 
|-
| 106 ||  || 2200 || 21 ||  || 
|-
| 107 ||  || 2200 || 20 ||  || 
|-
| 108 ||  || 2201 || 18 ||  || 
|}

Individual medals

 Performance rating:  Robert Hübner 2734
 Board 1:  Zenón Franco Ocampos (9/12) and  Raül García Paolicchi (10½/14) = 75.0%
 Board 2:  Dibyendu Barua 8½ / 11 = 77.3%
 Board 3:  Egon Brestian 9½ / 12 = 79.2%
 Board 4:  Roberto Martín del Campo 7½ / 10 = 75.0%
 1st reserve:  Satea Husari 6 / 7 = 85.7%
 2nd reserve:  Iolo Jones 6 / 7 = 85.7%

Women's event

65 teams from 63 different nations took part. Like the open event, the women's competition featured three Yugoslavian teams, all of which finished in the top 20. Lebanon were signed up, but didn't show up. Their first three matches were listed as forfeit, after which they were officially withdrawn.

In the event of a draw, the tie-break was decided first by using the Buchholz system, then by match points.

For the second Olympiad in a row, the Hungarian team beat the Soviet Union, although only on tie break this time. Once again, all three Polgár sisters (Zsuzsa, Zsófia, and Judit) were in the team - and they all won their respective boards. The best individual performance, however, came from Soviet reserve Arakhamia who registered a perfect 12/12 score and an unbelievable 2935 performance rating.

{| class="wikitable"
! # !! Country !! Players !! Averagerating !! Points !! Buchholz
|-
| style="background:gold;"|1 ||  || Zsuzsa Polgár, J. Polgár, Zsófia Polgár, Mádl || 2492 || 35 || 344.5
|-
| style="background:silver;"|2 ||  || Chiburdanidze, Gaprindashvili, Galliamova, Arakhamia || 2438 || 35 || 340.5
|-
| style="background:#cc9966;"|3 ||  || Xie Jun, Peng Zhaoqin, Qin Kanying, Wang Lei || 2302 || 29 || 
|}
{| class="wikitable collapsible collapsed"
! # !! Country !! Averagerating !! Points !! Buchholz !! MP
|-
| 4 ||  || 2258 || 26 ||  || 
|-
| 5 ||  || 2312 || 25 ||  || 
|-
| 6 ||  || 2357 || 24½ ||  || 
|-
| 7 ||  || 2235 || 24 || 351.5 || 
|-
| 8 ||  || 2242 || 24 || 337.0 || 
|-
| 9 ||  || 2275 || 24 || 334.0 || 
|-
| 10 ||  "B" || 2260 || 23½ || 342.5 || 
|-
| 11 ||  || 2248 || 23½ || 328.0 || 
|-
| 12 ||  || 2157 || 23½ || 303.5 || 
|-
| 13 ||  || 2112 || 23½ || 293.5 || 
|-
| 14 ||  || 2257 || 23 || 347.0 || 
|-
| 15 ||  || 2187 || 23 || 332.0 || 
|-
| 16 ||  || 2173 || 23 || 329.5 || 
|-
| 17 ||  || 2225 || 23 || 319.5 || 
|-
| 18 ||  || 2132 || 23 || 308.5 || 
|-
| 19 ||  || 2250 || 22½ || 345.5 || 
|-
| 20 ||  "C" || 2173 || 22½ || 329.5 || 
|-
| 21 ||  || 2000 || 22½ || 322.0 || 
|-
| 22 ||  || 2120 || 22 || 310.0 || 
|-
| 23 ||  || 2032 || 22 || 302.0 || 
|-
| 24 ||  || 2090 || 22 || 296.0 || 
|-
| 25 ||  || 2012 || 22 || 295.0 || 
|-
| 26 ||  || 2102 || 22 || 292.0 || 
|-
| 27 ||  || 2198 || 21½ || 319.5 || 
|-
| 28 ||  || 2133 || 21½ || 310.5 || 
|-
| 29 ||  || 2073 || 21½ || 299.5 || 
|-
| 30 ||  || 2022 || 21½ || 298.0 || 
|-
| 31 ||  || 2073 || 21½ || 295.5 || 
|-
| 32 ||  || 2150 || 21 || 312.0 || 
|-
| 33 ||  || 2040 || 21 || 305.0 || 
|-
| 34 ||  || 2063 || 21 || 252.0 || 
|-
| 35 ||  || 2000 || 20½ || 312.0 || 
|-
| 36 ||  || 2055 || 20½ || 289.0 || 
|-
| 37 ||  || 2042 || 20½ || 286.0 || 
|-
| 38 ||  || 2047 || 20½ || 275.5 || 
|-
| 39 ||  || 2005 || 20 || 297.0 || 
|-
| =40 ||  || 2000 || 20 || 278.5 || 13
|-
| =40 ||  || 2000 || 20 || 278.5 || 13
|-
| 42 ||  || 2032 || 20 || 276.5 || 
|-
| 43 ||  || 2000 || 20 || 269.5 || 
|-
| 44 ||  || 2000 || 20 || 264.0 || 
|-
| 45 ||  || 2007 || 20 || 262.0 || 
|-
| 46 ||  || 2050 || 19½ || 288.0 || 
|-
| 47 ||  || 2048 || 19½ || 275.0 || 
|-
| 48 ||  || 2003 || 19½ || 274.5 || 
|-
| 49 ||  || 2002 || 19½ || 262.5 || 
|-
| 50 ||   || 2000 || 19½ || 221.5 || 
|-
| 51 ||  || 2000 || 19 || 282.5 || 
|-
| 52 ||  || 2003 || 19 || 270.5 || 
|-
| 53 ||  || 2000 || 19 || 227.0 || 
|-
| 54 ||  || 2063 || 18½ || 286.0 || 
|-
| 55 ||  || 2000 || 18½ || 277.0 || 
|-
| 56 ||  || 2003 || 18 ||  || 
|-
| 57 ||  || 2000 || 17½ || 261.5 || 
|-
| 58 ||  || 2005 || 17½ || 236.5 || 
|-
| 59 ||  || 2000 || 17½ || 223.0 || 
|-
| 60 ||  || 2000 || 15½ || 219.0 || 
|-
| 61 ||  || 2000 || 15½ || 201.0 || 
|-
| 62 ||  || 2000 || 15 ||  || 
|-
| 63 ||  || 2000 || 14½ ||  || 
|-
| 64 ||  || 2000 || 11½ ||  || 
|-
| 65 ||  || 2000 || 10 ||  || 
|}

Individual medals

 Performance rating:  Ketevan Arakhamia 2935
 Board 1:  Zsuzsa Polgár 11½ / 14 = 82.1%
 Board 2:  Judit Polgár 10 / 13 = 76.9%
 Board 3:  Zsófia Polgár 11½ / 13 = 88.5%
 Reserve:  Ketevan Arakhamia 12 / 12 = 100.0%

References

External links

29th Chess Olympiad: Novi Sad 1990 OlimpBase

29
Women's Chess Olympiads
Olympiad 29
Chess Olympiad 29
Olympiad 29
Chess Olympiad 29
Chess Olympiad 29
Chess
Chess
21st century in Novi Sad